This is a complete list of National Heritage sites in Jamaica as published by the Jamaica National Heritage Trust.

Reference Map of Jamaica

Clarendon
Buildings of architectural and historic interest
Halse Hall Great House

Churches, cemeteries & tombs
St. Peter’s Church, Alley

Clock towers
May Pen Clock Tower

Natural sites
Milk River Spa

Botanical
Mason River Botanical Station
Lighthouses
 Portland Lighthouse

Hanover
Buildings of architectural and historic interest
The Great Barbican Estate
Tamarind Lodge
Old Hanover Gaol/Old Police Barracks, Lucea
Tryall Great House, and Ruins of Sugar Works

Forts and naval and military monuments
Fort Charlotte, Lucea

Historic sites
Blenheim – Birthplace of National Hero – The Rt. Excellent Sir Alexander Bustamante

Kingston
Buildings of architectural and historic interest
40 Harbour Street
Headquarters House, Duke Street
Kingston railway station, Barry Street
The Admiralty Houses, Port Royal

Churches, cemeteries & tombs
Old Jewish Cemetery, Hunts Bay
Negro Aroused
Coke Methodist Church, East Parade
Kingston Parish Church, South Parade
Wesley Methodist Church, Tower Street
Holy Trinity Cathedral, North Street

Statues and other memorials
The Bust of General Antonio Maceo, National Heroes' Park
The Cenotaph, National Heroes' Park
Negro Aroused, Ocean Boulevard
The Monument to Rt. Excellent Alexander Bustamante, National Heroes' Park
The Monument to Rt. Excellencies George William Gordon and Paul Bogle, National Heroes Park
The Monument to Rt. Excellent Marcus Garvey, National Heroes' Park
The Monument to Rt. Excellent Norman Manley, National Heroes' Park
The Monument to Rt. Excellent Sam Sharp, National Heroes' Park
The Monument to Rt. Excellent Nanny of the Maroons, National Heroes' Park
Monument to the Rt. Excellent Sam Sharpe, National Heroes' Park
The Monument to Rt. Hon. Donald Sangster, National Heroes' Park
The Statue of Queen Victoria (St. William Grant Park)
The Statue of Father Joseph Dupont (SWGP)
The Statue of Hon. Edward Jordan (SWGP)
The Statue of Sir Charles Metcalfe (SWGP)
The Statue of Rt. Excellent Alexander Bustamante (SWGP)

Forts and naval and military monuments
Fort Charles, Port Royal

Historic sites
Liberty Hall, 76 King Street
Port Royal and the Palisadoes

Public buildings
Ward Theatre, North Parade
George William Gordon House, Duke Street

Manchester
Buildings of architectural and historic interest
Marlborough Great House, Spur Tree
Four Buildings on the compound of the Northern Caribbean University Campus, Mandeville
Marshall's Pen Great House
Sutton railway station, Jamaica
Williamsfield railway station

Historic sites
Roxborough Castle Plantation – birthplace of National Hero, the Rt. Excellent Norman Manley

Public buildings
Mandeville Court House

Portland
Buildings of architectural and historic interest
DeMontevin Lodge, Port Antonio
Orange Bay railway station
Port Antonio railway station

Churches, cemeteries & tombs
Christ Church Anglican, Port Antonio

Forts and naval and military monuments
Fort George, Titchfield
The Old Military Barracks, Titchfield

Public buildings
Buff Bay Court House
Port Antonio Court House

 Lighthouses
Folly Lighthouse

Statues and other memorials
The Cenotaph, Port Antonio

Historic sites
Titchfield Peninsula
Port Antonio railway station grounds(?)

St Andrew
Aqueducts, bridges & dams
Papine-Mona Aqueduct, UWI Mona Campus

Buildings of architectural and historic interest
Bob Marley Museum, Hope Road
Jamaica College Buildings: Simms Hall, Scotland Building, Assembly Hall, Chapel
Charlottenburgh House, Guava Ridge
Mico College Buildings: Kelvin Lodge, Cottage, Porter’s Lodge, Chapel
Admiral’s Mountain Great House, Cooper’s Hill
Cherry Garden Great House, 46 Russell Heights
Devon House, Hope Road
Mona Great House, off Mona Road
Oakton House, Maxfield Avenue
“Regardless”, 4 Washington Drive
24 Tucker Avenue, former residence of National Hero, the Rt. Excellent Alexander Bustamante

Churches, cemeteries & tombs
Jamaica Free Baptist Church, August Town Road
St. Andrew Parish Church, Hagley Park Road
University of the West Indies Chapel,

Clock towers
Half Way Tree Clock Tower

Public building
Buxton House, Mico College Campus
UWI Mona Campus

Lighthouses
Plumb Point Lighthouse
Natural sites
Hope Botanical Gardens, Old Hope Road
Rockfort Mineral Bath and Spa, Sir Florizel Glasspole Boulevard

St Ann
Buildings of architectural and historic interest
Bellevue Great House, Orange Hall
Edinburgh Castle – ruins, main road from Harmony Vale to Pedro
Moneague Inn
Seville Great House
Moneague Hotel, Moneague College Campus
Cave Valley Chimney
Our Lady of Perpetual Help Church
St. Peter Martyr Site
Bellevue Great House
Iolaus
Mount Plenty Great House, Orange Hall
Seville Great House

Churches, cemeteries & tombs
Our Lady of Perpetual Help Church, St. Ann’s Bay
St. Peter Martyr Site (ruins of old Church), St. Ann’s Bay

Historic sites
32 Market Street, St. Ann’s Bay – birthplace of National Hero the Rt. Excellent Marcus Garvey

Miscellaneous
Cave Valley Chimney

St Catherine
Aqueducts, bridges & dams
Bushy Park Aqueduct
Old Iron Bridge, Spanish Town

Buildings of architectural and historic interest
Altenheim House, 24 King Street, Spanish Town
Colbeck Castle – ruin, near Old Harbour
Highgate House, Sligoville
Old Harbour railway station
Spanish Town railway station

Caves and middens
Mountain River Cave, Cudjoe Hill
Two Sisters Caves, Hellsh
Whitemarl Arawak Museum

Historic sites
Port Henderson
Spanish Town Historic District

Churches, cemeteries & tombs
Cathedral of St. Jago de la Vega (Anglican), Spanish Town
Phillippo Baptist Church, Spanish Town
St. Dorothy’s Anglican, Spanish Town to Old Harbour main road
Spanish Town Cathedral

St Elizabeth
Buildings of architectural and historic interest
Appleton Railway Station
Golmont View House, Reading
Invercauld House, Black River
Magdala House, Black River
Three Munro College Buildings: Coke Farquharson Dining Room, Chapel, Pearman Calder Building
Magdala House & Mineral Spa
Balaclava railway station

Historic sites
Black River Historic District

Natural sites
Black River Spa

Lighthouses
Lover’s Leap Lighthouse

St James
Buildings of architectural and historic interest
Anchovy railway station
Barnett Street Police Station, Montego Bay
Bellefield Great House
Cambridge railway station, Jamaica
Cinnamon Hill Great House
Greenwood Great House
Grove Hill House, Montego Bay
Harrison House, Montego Bay
Montpelier railway station, Jamaica
No. 1 King Street, Montego Bay
No. 2 Orange Street and No. 6 Corner Lane
Roehampton Great House
Rose Hall Great House
Town House, Montego Bay

Churches, cemeteries & tombs
Salter’s Hill Baptist Church – ruin
St. James Parish Church
St. Mary’s Anglican Church, Montpelier

Public buildings
Old Court House (Montego Bay Civic Centre)

Statues and other memorials
Sam Sharpe Monument

Industrial
Ironshore Windmill Tower

Miscellaneous
Old Albert Market, Montego Bay
Old Slave Ring, Montego Bay
The Dome, Montego Bay

St Mary
Buildings of architectural and historic interest
Firefly Estate (Noël Coward’s House)
Golden Clouds, Oracabessa
Harmony Hall Great House
Wentworth Estate

LIghthouses
Galina Lighthouse

Forts and naval and military monuments
Fort Haldane

Historic sites
Rio Nuevo Battle Site

Public buildings
Old Court House (Port Maria Civic Centre)

Statues and other memorials
Claude Stuart Park

St Thomas
Buildings of architectural and historic interest
Orange Park

Churches, Cemeteries & tombs
Christ Church, Morant Bay

Lighthouses
Morant Point Lighthouse

Historic sites
Stony Gut – Home of National Hero, The Rt. Excellent Paul Bogle

Natural sites
Bath Fountain Spa
Bath Botanical Gardens

Public buildings
Morant Bay Court House

Statues and other memorials
Statue of the Rt. Excellent Paul Bogle, Morant Bay

Trelawny
Buildings of architectural and historic interest
Barrett House – ruin, 1 Market Street Falmouth
Carlton House
Hyde Hall Great House
Stewart Castle – ruin
Vale Royal Great House

Churches, cemeteries & tombs
St. Peter’s Anglican Church, Falmouth

Clock towers
Duncans Clock Tower

Forts and naval and military monuments
Fort Balcarres, Falmouth

Historic site
Falmouth Historic District

Public buildings
Falmouth Courthouse
Falmouth Post Office

Westmoreland
Buildings of architectural and historic interest
Thomas Manning Building, Savanna-la-mar
Forts and naval and military monuments
Savanna-la-mar Fort
Lighthouses
Negril Lighthouse
Miscellaneous
Cast Iron Fountain

Underwater cultural heritage
Pedro Bank

References

National Heritage Sites
National Heritage Sites in Jamaica
National Heritage Sites
National Heritage Sites